Chapin, popularly known as the "Capital of Lake Murray", is a small lake town located at the northern tip of Lexington County, South Carolina, United States. Lake Murray separates Chapin from the rest of Lexington County. The population of Chapin was 1,445 according to the 2010 census, and an estimated 1,633 in 2019.

The town government is set up in the mayor-council form, and the current mayor is Albert Koon. Chapin has four public schools in the area; the first Chapin school was built in 1924. Lake Murray is the main attraction to Chapin and provides boaters with water-related recreation.

History
Chapin is named after Martin Chapin in 1889. After Chapin and Laura Anne Benjamin were married on June 16, 1850, the couple moved down South because of Martin's health (a lung condition). The Chapins were living in Columbia when Martin's doctor suggested he to move to the Piney Woods area. He bought property in this area, and over the years Chapin bought . He built a home in Piney Woods and later a hotel in the 1880s along the new rail line that ran from Columbia to Laurens, the Columbia, Newberry and Laurens Railroad. The railroad provided a way to trade and transport goods to the capital city. Cotton and the lumber industry were flourishing with the railroad providing transportation. After Martin's death on August 31, 1894, Laura Chapin sold their home and moved into the Chapin hotel.

On March 28, 1907, Job S. Wessinger, P.M. Frick, and J. S. Honeycut founded the Bank of Chapin. One year later the building for the bank was built. The bank prospered with help from the railroad.

During World War I, Chapin was doing well economically. The price of cotton had risen and the farmers were making plenty of money. As a result, the Bank of Chapin was also thriving during this time. The first high school was built in 1924.

Slowly the businesses in Chapin were starting to experience hard times nearing the 1930s. On Thursday, October 15, 1931, the Bank of Chapin did not open, and like other banks around the world, the bank would not allow customers to withdraw their money. Anybody who had money saved in the bank lost that money due to the crash of the stock market, later known as the start of the Great Depression. Another disaster to hit Chapin was the building of the dam on the Saluda River that would result in the building of a lake. This lake would take over most of the Chapin families’ farms and homesteads. The building of the dam was started in 1927.

In the midst of the Great Depression Chapin started a recreational team sport of baseball. In 1935, the Dutch Fork League was formed where Chapin had its own team. This team helped the unemployed men occupy their time during these difficult times. These baseball games attracted thousands of people.

During the 1940s Chapin grew through improvements to the school and opening new businesses. One new business that came to Chapin were filling stations. The next business was a cabinet shop called E. A. Frick and Son. Chapin also built paved roads, a baseball field and established the public library. In 1950 the first post office building was constructed, along with new telephone services.

The 1960s were about new and better services. Garbage collection was an issue in the '60s, so the town government bought land and built a landfill.  Transportation was the next service provided by access to an interstate highway. On September 7, 1960 a section of Interstate 26 was opened between Columbia and Pomaria. The interstate made Chapin more accessible. Streets in town were also improved. Another improvement of the '60s was the new water system.  In 1965 a volunteer fire department was organized, and in 1966 the town had its first ambulance. Chapin also started growing in population as more people moved to the town in the 1960s.

During the 1970s new schools were built. Chapin football became a community event, and the school football team won state championships in 1973 and 1974. Also in the '70s churches in the town of Chapin were growing by establishment of Chapin Baptist Church, St. Francis of Assisi Episcopal Church, Our Lady of the Lake Catholic Church, and Lake Murray Presbyterian Church.

The Robinson-Hiller House was listed on the U.S. National Register of Historic Places in 1998, and the Chapin Commercial Historic District was added in 2019.

Geography
Chapin is located in the northern corner of Lexington County at  (34.165783, -81.347260).

While Chapin is a part of Lexington County, the creation of Lake Murray by the Dreher Shoals Dam cut Chapin off from the rest of the county by road, creating something of an exclave.

Demographics

2000 census
According to the 2000 Census, the incorporated limits of the Town of Chapin had a population of 628. The census counted 249 occupied housing units within the town.  Per capita income was $24,124.  Median household income within the town limits was $48,750.

2010 census
The 2010 Census recorded that Chapin has a population of 1,445 with 658 total housing units within town limits.

2020 census

As of the 2020 United States census, there were 1,809 people, 768 households, and 524 families residing in the town.

Government
Chapin's mayor and the town council run for a four-year term. The council has chosen a Mayor-Council form of government. This means that the mayor has more majority status than council members. Chapin's town government is made up of three council members, a mayor pro tem, and a mayor. Currently the Mayor of Chapin is Albert Koon. The Mayor Pro Tem is Mike Clonts along with the council members who are Gregg White, Leland Teal. .

History
In 1940 the mayor was S. J. Cannon. He served a one-year term along with officers W.W. Goza, H. E. Metts, Carl Shealy, and W. B. Fulmer. Other offices voted on during this election were town clerk and policeman. The next year, 1941, W. W. Goza was elected mayor and served until 1944. In 1944, J. L. Amick was elected mayor. Numerous others have served as mayor between J. L. Amick and Albert Koon.

Education
Chapin High School
Chapin Middle School
Chapin Intermediate School
Chapin Elementary School
Lake Murray Elementary School
Spring Hill High School
Piney Woods Elementary School

History of local schools
The first school in Chapin was located in the Chapin house. In 1924 a high school was built out of concrete blocks and brick. In 1927 the school alma mater “Chapin, Dear Chapin” was composed by Helen Miller. This alma mater is the same one used at Chapin High School today.

Chapin schools and churches were the center of life in town according to historian Addison Bostain. Chapin High School had 150 students enrolled in 1929 and the elementary school had 150 students.  The school only housed 11 grades.

Chapin High School had been built in separate parts since 1924 and by 1940 the high school still did not have a gym. The school auditorium was home to both the theater and a basketball court. The gymnasium was not built until 1952. The Chapin community built the gym for less than $30,000 dollars.

The 12th grade was added to Chapin High School in 1948 as well as the first football team. The football team was a very expensive investment, so in 1952 the Irmo and Chapin High School football teams were combined. Together they were known as the Flying Dutchmen football team. The teams separated again, and Chapin has had its own team since 1959.

In 1970 a new high school was built with much better facilities. The school had new labs, band, chorus, and physical educational areas. In addition to a new building, the Chapin football team became a powerhouse for football in state of South Carolina. Cecil Woolbright became Chapin High School's head football coach and athletic director in 1968. The Chapin High School Eagles won two state championships and three conference titles in three years. This happened in 1973, 74 and 75, along with a 30-game winning streak. The Chapin High School's mascot is named Cecil the Eagle.

A new elementary school opened in August 1977. The school could house 840 children.

Library
Chapin has a public library, a branch of the Lexington County Public Library.

Churches
The first church established in Chapin was Mt. Horeb Lutheran Church in 1891. The Chapin Methodist Church was established in 1889, but was not within town limits until 1892. Again in 1892, Mt. Zion Baptist Church was started with an African American congregation. Another church for African Americans was St. John's AME church, which is older than Mt. Zion, but the date is unknown. Much later in 1972 was the start of Chapin Baptist Church. Lake Murray Presbyterian Church was organized in 1974. Next to arrive in Chapin was St. Francis of Assisi Episcopal Church in 1977. Our Lady of the Lake Catholic Church was established in 1978.
Chapin Baptist Church
Chapin Community Church
Chapin Fellowship Bible Church
Chapin Presbyterian Church
Chapin United Methodist Church
Lake Murray Presbyterian Church
Mt. Horeb Lutheran Church
Mt. Zion Baptist Church
Our Lady of the Lake Catholic Church
St. Francis of Assisi Episcopal Church
St. John AME Church
St. Peter Lutheran Church ELCA

Attractions

Lake Murray

Chapin is often referred to as the "capital of Lake Murray". On September 21, 1927, work on the dam for the Saluda River was started. The construction finished on June 30, 1930. Chapin families who had lived on Chapin land for over 200 years had to sell and move to make room for the lake that was a result of the dam.

The dam itself takes up . The nearest arm of the lake reaches within  of the town limits.

The dam on Lake Murray has been through many changes since it was originally built in 1927. In 1943  were added to the dam's height to help flooding issues. Much later in the 1980s SCE&G added a sheet piling way on the lakeside of the highway again to help with flooding. This sheet piling way raised the height of the dam again.

The latest changes to the dam occurred in 2002 when the backup dam was built. The backup dam was built for more protection to withstand earthquakes. The backup dam is made of rock and concrete to withstand the weight of the water behind the dam if any damage were to occur to the existing dam.

Lake Murray is not only used to provide electrical power for surrounding areas, it brings boating activities to the area. Lake Murray offers many different types of boating opportunities in addition to recreational areas.  Today, the lake has recreational swimming, boating, skiing, fishing, and wake-boarding. The lake also holds fishing tournaments and is home to many kinds of wildlife. Lake Murray is known for its purple martins, striped bass, and great blue heron.

Labor Day Festival
Chapin is home to the Chapin Labor Day Festival. The Chapin Labor Day Festival is held every year in the town of Chapin on Labor Day. The festival lasts for three days starting on the Saturday before Labor Day and ending on Labor Day. On Monday, the festival activities start off with a parade through town and often features local, state and sometimes national political candidates.  The Chapin High School NJROTC also marches in the parade annually.  After the parade there is a carnival, Chapin Idol, vendors, food, concerts, and a car show along  the historic streets of downtown Chapin.

Notable people
Deepfield, rock band; lead singer Baxter Teal
Iron & Wine (born in 1974), stage name of indie-folk singer-songwriter Samuel Beam
DeWayne Wise (born in 1978), former outfielder in the Chicago White Sox organization and Atlanta Braves

References

External links

Towns in Lexington County, South Carolina
Towns in South Carolina
Columbia metropolitan area (South Carolina)